The narrow-gauge railway of KSM-2 factory is located in Tver, Russia. It is used for the transportation of sand from the "Red Quarry" to the KSM-2 factory.

Current status 
The Tver plant of building materials No.2 located near the town of Tver. The main task of the narrow-gauge railway is the transportation of sand from the quarry to the KSM-2 factory.

Rolling stock

Locomotives
 TU7 – No. 1231, 1703, 3155, 3215
 TU6A – No. 0635
 TU6D – No. 0037
 TU8P – No. 0001

Railroad car
 Side-tipping wagons
 Snow blower – TU6D

Gallery

See also
Narrow-gauge railways in Russia

References and sources

External links

 Official Website 
 «The site of the railroad» S. Bolashenko 
 Photo - project «Steam Engine» 

750 mm gauge railways in Russia
Rail transport in Tver Oblast